Clyde Wells may refer to:
Clyde Kirby Wells (born 1937), Canadian politician
Clyde H. Wells (1916 – 1987), regent of the Texas A&M University System

See also 
 Wells (name)